Alois Höfler (April 6,  1853 – February 26,  1922) was an Austrian  philosopher and university professor of education in Prague and Vienna. He was seen by the logical positivist Otto Neurath as an important link between Bernard Bolzano's work and the Vienna Circle.

Family 
Alois Höfler was born in Kirchdorf in Upper Austria. His father and mother died while he was in his early and middle teens. He and his two younger sisters were then raised by a second mother, Amalie Boheim. He had four sons with his wife Auguste Dornhöffer, including Otto Höfler.

Career 
In the Fall of 1871, Alois entered the University of Vienna where he studied mathematics and physics with Ludwig Boltzmann  and Josef Stefan.   After his teaching examination in 1876 at the age of 23, he taught in the  Josefstädter-gymnasium and other gymnasiums (advanced secondary schools)  in Vienna.  He received his doctoral degree in 1885,  under Meinong supervision in Graz, with a thesis titled  Some Laws of Incompatibility between Judgments.    He received his habilitation in 1894 at the University of Vienna with a thesis titled "Psychic work".  During the 1870's and 1880's Höfler also attended evening classes taught by Brentano and Meinong.  His philosophical view was strongly influenced by Meinong. From 1881 to 1903 he taught mathematics, physics and philosophical propaedeutics at the grammar school of the Theresian Academy in Vienna. He became professor of  philosophy and pedagogy in Prague in 1903 (as successor to Otto Willmann) and at the University of Vienna in 1907 (as successor to Theodor Vogt).  

His increasing interest in philosophy and in making it more scientific led him to study and write increasingly on logic and psychology as well.  In the opinion of the ardent logical positivist Otto Neurath,  through his involvement in the School of Brentano, he was an important connection  between the work on logic of Bernard Bolzano and the Vienna Circle. In 1914, he reprinted the 77 years old Bolzano's Theory of Science, which was said to be almost impossible to find at the time. He also loved music, poetry, and the arts. He strongly opposed attempting to reduce their role in schools.

Abbreviated references

References

 
 
 
 
 
 
 
 
 
 

1853 births
1922 deaths
Academic staff of the University of Vienna
19th-century educators
Austrian psychologists
20th-century philosophers